"Waterspider" is a science fiction short story by American writer Philip K. Dick, first published in the January 1964 edition of If magazine.

Dick's story "Waterspider" features Poul Anderson as one of the main characters. The author refers to himself and his stories "The Variable Man" and "The Defenders", and mentions several other science fiction writers of the period, including Murray Leinster, A. E. van Vogt, Margaret St. Clair, Jack Vance, and Isaac Asimov.

References

External links
Worlds of IF (January 1964) at the Wayback Machine, archived March 2, 2016.

Short stories by Philip K. Dick
1964 short stories
Works originally published in If (magazine)